The 1982 Arizona State Sun Devils football team was an American football team that represented Arizona State University in the Pacific-10 Conference (Pac-10) during the 1982 NCAA Division I-A football season. In their third season under head coach Darryl Rogers, the Sun Devils compiled a 10–2 record (5–2 against Pac-10 opponents), finished in a tie for third place in the Pac-10, and outscored their opponents by a combined total of 294 to 145.

The team's statistical leaders included Todd Hons with 2,338 passing yards, Darryl Clack with 606 rushing yards, and Doug Allen with 424 receiving yards.

Schedule

Roster

Rankings

Game summaries

Washington

vs. Oklahoma (Fiesta Bowl)

1983 NFL Draft

References

Arizona State
Arizona State Sun Devils football seasons
Fiesta Bowl champion seasons
Arizona State Sun Devils football